Scouting activities in the Philippines have been promoted by various organizations: the YMCA, the Boy Scouts of America, the Camp Fire Girls, the Boy Scouts of the Philippines, the Girl Scouts of the Philippines, and the Boy Scouts of China.

Beginnings 

Youth Scouting was founded in the Philippines in 1910 in Manila by Elwood Stanley Brown (1883-1924) of the YMCA. The Boy Scouts of Calivo (now Kalibo in Aklan) was founded on April 22, 1922, by a certain Mr. Ong. The Boy Scouts of America Philippine Islands Council No. 545 was founded in 1923 in Manila by the Rotary Club of Manila.  The Boy Scouts of the Philippines was legally established in 1936 in Manila through the work of three men: Josephus Emile Hamilton Stevenot (1888-1943), Tomás Confesór y Valenzuela (1891-1951), and Manuél Luís Quezon y Molina (1878-1944), and the organization started activities in 1938. The term "Boy Scouts of the Philippines" was first used by Theodore Roosevelt in 1911 and by Sir Robert Stephenson Baden-Powell in 1912.

The 1973 celebration of the Golden Jubilee of Philippine Scouting and the Golden Jubilee Jamboree of the Boy Scouts of the Philippines were dated from the establishment of the BSA Philippine Islands Council No. 545 in 1923, but the 2014 "Philippine Scouting Centennial Jamboree" commemorated the founding of the Lorillard Spencer Troop in 1914.

In 1910, the first troops were organised by Elwood Stanley Brown, Physical Director of the Manila YMCA. In 1912, Elwood Stanley Brown was recognised by Baden-Powell as "Chief Scoutmaster." In 1913, troops were organised by Mark Thompson, Antonio Torres, Domingo Ponce, and Francisco Varona. In 1914, the Lorillard Spencer Troop organised in November in Zamboanga City by Sherman L. Kiser, organized as Mindanao's first Scout troop.

In 1921, Scouting started at Silliman Institute under the auspices of its church, one of the first in Negros. They applied for registration to BSA National Headquarters, New York, in 1922, and received their document in January 1923 (some eight or nine months before the creation of the BSA Philippine Islands Council No. 545). On April 19, 1922, Mr. Ong of Calivo, Capiz (now Kalibo, Aklan) organized the Boy Scouts of Calivo which the Governor General Leonard Wood at that time acknowledged in his letter dated January 2, 1923. In 1923, the Rotary Club established the Boy Scouts of America Philippine Islands Council No. 545 in October, formalizing the formation of a singular national scout organization in the country. An Order of the Arrow lodge was later formed in the capital.

In 1931, the first test Cub and Sea Scout formations were formed to test these two concepts for wider implementation.

In 1933, the Philippines first participated in an international Scout event, with the BSA Philippine Islands Council delegation embedded in the BSA contingent to the 4th World Scout Jamboree in Budapest, Hungary. In 1934, Rover Scouting was introduced. The BSA Shanghai District was placed under the supervision of the BSA Philippine Islands Council No. 545.

Foundation of the movement 
In 1936, the Boy Scouts of the Philippines was established by a legislative act. The first BSP President and Chief Scout was Josephus Stevenot. In 1937, the BSA Philippine Islands Council No. 545, meeting in October, decided on the handover of its properties and responsibilities to the nascent BSP. 

In 1938, the BSP was inaugurated by Pres. Manuel Quezon on January 1, and started functioning.  Exequiél Villacorta was appointed the first "Chief Scout Executive" of the Boy Scouts of the Philippines, in imitation of the BSA Chief Scout Executive. 

In 1946, in time for its 10th anniversary, the BSP was declared a full member of the World Organization of the Scout Movement. A decade later, the BSP was selected to be the host of the WOSM's Asia-Pacific Region.

In 1947, the BSP made its first participation in an international event, with the BSP contingent to the 6th World Scout Jamboree in Moisson, France. In 1953, the first Wood Badge course was conducted at BSP Camp Gre-Zar in Novaliches, Quezon City. In 1954, the first BSP National Scout Jamboree was held at Rolling Hills, Balarâ, Quezon City. 

Dr. Mariano Villarama de los Santos served on the World Scout Committee from 1957 until 1959, the first Filipino member of the committee. 

In 1959, the 10th World Scout Jamboree was held at the National Scout Reservation, University of the Philippines, Los Baños, at the foot of Mount Makiling, in the province of Laguna.  This was the first World Scout Jamboree outside Europe and Canada.

Filipinization 

In 1960, the BSP began the nationalization of the scouting system. The BSP Cub Scout program was revised to replace American symbols (e.g. Bobcat, Bear Cub, Wolf Cub, Lion Cub) with Philippine motifs (e.g. Kawan, Mother Usa, Chief Usa, Young Usa, Lauan, Molave, Narra and Leaping Usa). In 1961, the Boy Scout program was revised to replace American symbols (e.g. Eagle) with Philippine motifs (e.g. Maginoo, Jose Rizal). In 1963, 24 members of the BSP delegation to the 11th World Scout Jamboree in Marathon, Greece, died in a plane crash in the sea off the coast of Mumbai, India. Streets in the South Triangle District of Quezon City were later named in their memory by the city council a year later.

In 1968, Boy Scouts, Rovers, and Scouters joined in the search-and-rescue operations for victims of the Ruby Tower collapse in August.  For the services rendered by the Scouts, the BSP organization was awarded by President Ferdinand Marcos with a Presidential Gold Medal the following year. In 1970, Senior Scouting officially launched as part of the BSP program replacing Explorers. It has three sections: Air (grey uniform), Land (dark green), and Sea (white). In 1971, Ambassador Antonio C. Delgado was elected Chairman of the World Scout Conference, becoming the first Filipino to hold this position. In 1972, BSP membership hit the one-million mark. In 1973, the Golden Jubilee Jamboree and first Asia-Pacific Jamboree was held at the National Scout Reservation, University of the Philippines, Los Baños, Laguna. The jamboree song, "Kapatirang Paglilingkod," reflected the Bagong Lipunan regime of President Ferdinand Marcos. In 1974–75, the Cub Scout name is Philippinised: the Pilipino alphabet at that time did not include the letter C, so "Cub" was replaced with "Kab". However, since "kab" was not actually a Pilipino word, it was contrived as an acronym for "Kabataan Alay sa Bayan" and written in all caps. 

In 1975–86, in compliance with the orders of President Marcos, the Boy Scouts of the Philippines was renamed "Kapatirang Scout ng Pilipinas,"  which translates literally to "Scout Brotherhood of the Philippines."  The Scout age groups were reduced from four to two. The Scout Oath and Scout Law were revised. A new Scout badge was devised. President Marcos took the title of Chief Scout, the first Philippine head of state to hold the title. 

In 1986, the BSP marked its Golden Jubilee. In the aftermath of the People Power Revolution, the name Kapatirang Scout ng Pilipinas was abandoned and the organization reverted to its original name "Boy Scouts of the Philippines." In 1990–91, a program was created for pre-school boys and named KID Scouting.  Since "kid" is English and not Filipino, it was contrived as an acronym for "Kabataang Iminumulat Diwa" and written in all caps. In 1991, the 12th Asia-Pacific Jamboree was held at Philippine Scouting Center, University of the Philippines, Los Baños, Laguna. In 1992, the old BSP badge was reinstated. In 1993, the Philippines hosted the first ASEAN Scout Jamboree. In 1997, the 2nd World Scout Parliamentary Union held in Manila. In 1999, the first Venture Scout Jamboree was held on Ilian Hills, Iriga City, Camarines Sur, Bicol. In 2007, the BSP observed the world centennial of the Scout Movement. In 2009–10, the BSP hosted the 26th Asia-Pacific Jamboree from 28 December to 3 January. This was the third APR Jamboree in the Philippines.

In 2011, the BSP celebrated 75 years of Philippine Scouting. In 2013, the National Peace Jamboree held on Mount Makiling in Laguna, in Capitol Hills Scout Camp in Cebu, and the BSP's Camp Malagos in Davao.

In 2014: Centennial (1914–2014) of the defunct Lorillard Spencer Troop. A "Centennial Jamboree" was held in three venues: Marikina (Luzon), Cebu City (Visayas), and Zamboanga City (Mindanao).

References

Scouting in the Philippines